Davy is a small lunar impact crater that is located on the eastern edge of the Mare Nubium. It was named after British physicist Humphry Davy. It overlies the lava-flooded remains of the satellite crater Davy Y to the east, a formation which contains a crater chain designated Catena Davy. To the southeast of Davy is the prominent crater Alphonsus.

The outer rim of Davy is low, and the interior has been partly resurfaced. The perimeter is somewhat polygonal in shape, especially in the western half, and the southeast rim has been overlain by Davy A. The latter is bowl-shaped with a notch in the northern rim. The interior of Davy lacks a central peak, although there are some low central mounds and the rim of Davy Y forms a low ridge leading from the northern outer rim.

Catena Davy

This linear string of 23 tiny craters runs from the midpoint of Davy Y towards the walled basin Ptolemaeus, following a slightly curving course to the east-northeast. It is located at selenographic coordinates 11.0° S, 7.0° W, and has a length of 50 km.

This formation is not believed to be due to secondary cratering because it is not radial to a suitable source crater. The most likely cause is believed to be a single body that broke apart prior to impact due to tidal effects. High resolution images have demonstrated that the craters formed at about the same time since the ejecta from each crater does not overlay neighboring craters. However, there are still some scientists who believe that this chain of craters may be volcanic in origin.

In 1974, six of the craters in the chain were given "unofficial" names for use in connection with NASA's Topophotomap 77D1S1(10).  These names, listed below, were later adopted by the IAU. Their positions in the chain are not readily distinguished based on their official coordinates, but they are well identified on the topophotomap.

Catena Davy was considered as a possible early Apollo landing site.

Satellite craters

By convention these features are identified on lunar maps by placing the letter on the side of the crater midpoint that is closest to Davy.

References

External links

 Topophotomap 77D1S1(10) showing location of minor named features.
 Lunar Orbiter map and photo of Alphonsus, shows relationship of Davy to Alphonsus and Ptolemeus.
 
 
 
 
 
 

Impact craters on the Moon